The 2021 NACAC U23 Championships in Athletics was the 11th edition of the biennial NACAC U23 athletics championships. They were held in San José, Costa Rica from 9 July to 11 July. For the first time an U20 competition was held next to the U23 and U18 categories.

Medal summary

U23 men

U23 women

U23 mixed

U20 men

U20 women

U18 boys

U18 girls

U18 mixed

Medal table
Source:

Participation
263 athletes (158 men and 105 women) from 19 nations participated in these championships.

 (4)
 (35)
 (9)
 (2)
 (6)
 (64)
 (14)
 (6)
 (2)
 (14)
 (3)
 (61)
 (3)
 (17)
 (3)
 (6)
 (10)
 (3)
 (1)

References

External links
 NACAC Home Page
 Meet Results
 Results book

NACAC Under-23 Championships in Athletics
NACAC Under-20 Championships in Athletics
NACAC Under-18 Championships in Athletics
Sport in Costa Rica
Nacac U18 U20 and U23 Championships
Nacac U18 U20 and U23 Championships
International athletics competitions hosted by Costa Rica
Nacac U18 U20 and U23 Championships